Narathip Kruearanya (born  December 19, 1995) is a Thai professional footballer who plays as a winger and forward.

References

External links
 

1995 births
Living people
Narathip Kruearanya
Association football forwards
Narathip Kruearanya
Narathip Kruearanya